Chilhowee Historic District is a national historic district located at Chilhowee, Johnson County, Missouri.   The district encompasses 21 contributing buildings in the central business district of Chilhowee.  It developed between about 1904 and 1930 and includes representative examples of Late Victorian style architecture. Notable contributing buildings include the Farmers Bank (1907), Murphy Bros. Hardware (1907), Valentine & Son's General Store (1906), Farmers Produce Exchange (1907), Chilhowee Senior Citizens Building (c. 1905), Chilhowee Bank (1915), and City garage (c. 1907).

It was listed on the National Register of Historic Places in 1988.

References

Historic districts on the National Register of Historic Places in Missouri
Victorian architecture in Missouri
Buildings and structures in Johnson County, Missouri
National Register of Historic Places in Johnson County, Missouri